Kalk Bay (Afrikaans: Kalkbaai) is a fishing village on the coast of False Bay, South Africa and is now a suburb of greater Cape Town. It lies between the ocean and sharply rising mountainous heights that are buttressed by crags of grey Table Mountain Sandstone. The railway from Cape Town to Simon's Town passes through Kalk Bay and in some places the line is only metres from the water's edge.

In 2018 Forbes Magazine voted the neighborhood one of the "coolest in the world".

History 

The foundation stone for the harbour was laid in 1913. A literal translation from the Dutch/Afrikaans name "Kalkbaai" is "Lime Bay". This derives from the vast deposits of mussel shells found there, which early settlers burned to make lime for construction. Lime kilns to roast mussel shells are still found along the west coast. 

Several famous caves (with names such as 'Boomslang Cave' named after the snake, 'Ronan's Well', after the Walter Scott novel Saint Ronan's Well, and 'Free Drinks Saloon') are located in the mountains above the village. They are of importance to speleologists because they have formed in sandstone. Large cave systems are not often found in this type of chemically unreactive rock.

Kalk Bay is also home to the tiny but locally famous surf spot named "Kalk Bay Reef". This is renowned for heavy barrels and the associated shallow reef. It is best surfed on a big south-easterly swell or a north west wind. In smaller swells low tide makes for better barrels. Southern right whales come here during whale watching seasons, and are often seen playing or resting very close to surfers or piers. Whale activity can often be seen from Boyes Drive, a road that connects the southern suburbs of Cape Town to Kalk Bay and suburbs further south on the Peninsula.

Coat of arms
Kalk Bay (including Muizenberg and St James) was a municipality from 1895 to 1913.  The town council assumed a coat of arms, designed by Frank Newnes, in July 1901.

The shield was divided horizontally.  The upper half was divided vertically, depicting a fishing boat (partly obscured by a small shield) and eight fleurs de lis, while the lower half depicted a bunch of grapes.  A small shield displaying an arum lily was placed in the centre.

See also
Ports and harbours in South Africa

References

External links

Suburbs of Cape Town
Ports and harbours of South Africa